

Peerage of England

|Duke of Cornwall (1337)||Prince Charles||1630||1649||Ascended the Throne, and all his honours merged in the Crown
|-
|Duke of Buckingham (1623)||George Villiers, 2nd Duke of Buckingham||1628||1687||
|-
|Duke of Richmond (1641)||James Stewart, 1st Duke of Richmond||1641||1655||New creation
|-
|Duke of Cumberland (1644)||Prince Rupert of the Rhine||1644||1682||New creation
|-
|Duke of York (1644)||James Stuart||1644||1685||New creation
|-
|Marquess of Winchester (1551)||John Paulet, 5th Marquess of Winchester||1628||1675||
|-
|Marquess of Hertford (1641)||William Seymour, 1st Marquess of Hertford||1641||1660||New creation
|-
|rowspan="2"|Marquess of Worcester (1642)||Henry Somerset, 1st Marquess of Worcester||1642||1646||New creation; died
|-
|Edward Somerset, 2nd Marquess of Worcester||1646||1667||
|-
|Marquess of Newcastle-upon-Tyne (1643)||William Cavendish, 1st Marquess of Newcastle-upon-Tyne||1643||1676||New creation
|-
|Marquess of Dorchester (1645)||Henry Pierrepont, 1st Marquess of Dorchester||1645||1680||New creation
|-
|rowspan="2"|Earl of Arundel (1138)||Thomas Howard, 21st Earl of Arundel||1604||1646||Died
|-
|Henry Howard, 22nd Earl of Arundel||1646||1652||
|-
|Earl of Oxford (1142)||Aubrey de Vere, 20th Earl of Oxford||1632||1703||
|-
|Earl of Shrewsbury (1442)||John Talbot, 10th Earl of Shrewsbury||1630||1654||
|-
|rowspan="2"|Earl of Kent (1465)||Anthony Grey, 9th Earl of Kent||1639||1643||Died
|-
|Henry Grey, 10th Earl of Kent||1643||1651||
|-
|rowspan="2"|Earl of Derby (1485)||William Stanley, 6th Earl of Derby||1594||1642||Died
|-
|James Stanley, 7th Earl of Derby||1642||1651||
|-
|Earl of Worcester (1514)||Henry Somerset, 5th Earl of Worcester||1628||1646||Created Marquess of Worcester, see above
|-
|rowspan="2"|Earl of Cumberland (1525)||Francis Clifford, 4th Earl of Cumberland||1605||1641||Died
|-
|Henry Clifford, 5th Earl of Cumberland||1641||1643||Died, title extinct
|-
|rowspan="2"|Earl of Rutland (1525)||George Manners, 7th Earl of Rutland||1632||1641||Died
|-
|John Manners, 8th Earl of Rutland||1641||1679||
|-
|rowspan="2"|Earl of Huntingdon (1529)||Henry Hastings, 5th Earl of Huntingdon||1604||1643||Died
|-
|Ferdinando Hastings, 6th Earl of Huntingdon||1643||1656||
|-
|Earl of Sussex (1529)||Edward Radclyffe, 6th Earl of Sussex||1629||1643||Died, title extinct
|-
|Earl of Bath (1536)||Henry Bourchier, 5th Earl of Bath||1636||1654||
|-
|Earl of Southampton (1547)||Thomas Wriothesley, 4th Earl of Southampton||1624||1667||
|-
|rowspan="2"|Earl of Bedford (1550)||Francis Russell, 4th Earl of Bedford||1627||1641||Died
|-
|William Russell, 5th Earl of Bedford||1641||1700||
|-
|rowspan="2"|Earl of Pembroke (1551)||Philip Herbert, 4th Earl of Pembroke||1630||1649||Died
|-
|Philip Herbert, 5th Earl of Pembroke||1649||1669||
|-
|Earl of Devon (1553)||William Courtenay, de jure 5th Earl of Devon||1638||1702||
|-
|Earl of Northumberland (1557)||Algernon Percy, 10th Earl of Northumberland||1632||1668||
|-
|Earl of Hertford (1559)||William Seymour, 2nd Earl of Herford||1621||1660||Created Marquess of Hertford, see above
|-
|Earl of Essex (1572)||Robert Devereux, 3rd Earl of Essex||1604||1646||Died, title extinct; Viscountcy of Hereford succeeded by a cousin, see below
|-
|Earl of Lincoln (1572)||Theophilus Clinton, 4th Earl of Lincoln||1619||1667||
|-
|rowspan="2"|Earl of Nottingham (1596)||Charles Howard, 2nd Earl of Nottingham||1624||1642||Died
|-
|Charles Howard, 3rd Earl of Nottingham||1642||1681||
|-
|rowspan="2"|Earl of Suffolk (1603)||Theophilus Howard, 2nd Earl of Suffolk||1626||1640||Died
|-
|James Howard, 3rd Earl of Suffolk||1640||1689||
|-
|Earl of Dorset (1604)||Edward Sackville, 4th Earl of Dorset||1624||1652||
|-
|rowspan="3"|Earl of Exeter (1605)||William Cecil, 2nd Earl of Exeter||1623||1640||Died
|-
|David Cecil, 3rd Earl of Exeter||1640||1643||
|-
|David Cecil, 3rd Earl of Exeter||1643||1678||
|-
|Earl of Salisbury (1605)||William Cecil, 2nd Earl of Salisbury||1612||1668||
|-
|Earl of Somerset (1613)||Robert Carr, 1st Earl of Somerset||1613||1645||Died, title extinct
|-
|rowspan="2"|Earl of Bridgewater (1617)||John Egerton, 1st Earl of Bridgewater||1617||1649||Died
|-
|John Egerton, 2nd Earl of Bridgewater||1649||1686||
|-
|rowspan="2"|Earl of Northampton (1618)||Spencer Compton, 2nd Earl of Northampton||1630||1643||Died
|-
|James Compton, 3rd Earl of Northampton||1643||1681||
|-
|Earl of Leicester (1618)||Robert Sidney, 2nd Earl of Leicester||1626||1677||
|-
|Earl of Warwick (1618)||Robert Rich, 2nd Earl of Warwick||1618||1658||
|-
|Earl of Devonshire (1618)||William Cavendish, 3rd Earl of Devonshire||1628||1684||
|-
|Earl of March (1619)||James Stewart, 2nd Earl of March||1624||1655||Duke of Lennox in the Peerage of Scotland; created Duke of Richmond in 1641, see above
|-
|rowspan="2"|Earl of Cambridge (1619)||James Hamilton, 2nd Earl of Cambridge||1625||1649||Marquess, and after 1643 Duke of Hamilton in the Peerage of Scotland; died
|-
|William Hamilton, 3rd Earl of Cambridge||1649||1651||Duke of Hamilton in the Peerage of Scotland
|-
|Earl of Carlisle (1622)||James Hay, 2nd Earl of Carlisle||1636||1660||
|-
|rowspan="2"|Earl of Denbigh (1622)||William Feilding, 1st Earl of Denbigh||1622||1643||Died
|-
|Basil Feilding, 2nd Earl of Denbigh||1643||1675||
|-
|Earl of Bristol (1622)||John Digby, 1st Earl of Bristol||1622||1653||
|-
|rowspan="2"|Earl of Middlesex (1622)||Lionel Cranfield, 1st Earl of Middlesex||1622||1645||Died
|-
|James Cranfield, 2nd Earl of Middlesex||1645||1651||
|-
|Earl of Anglesey (1623)||Charles Villiers, 2nd Earl of Anglesey||1630||1661||
|-
|rowspan="2"|Earl of Holland (1624)||Henry Rich, 1st Earl of Holland||1624||1649||Died
|-
|Robert Rich, 2nd Earl of Holland||1649||1675||
|-
|Earl of Clare (1624)||John Holles, 2nd Earl of Clare||1637||1666||
|-
|rowspan="2"|Earl of Bolingbroke (1624)||Oliver St John, 1st Earl of Bolingbroke||1624||1646||Died
|-
|Oliver St John, 2nd Earl of Bolingbroke||1646||1688||
|-
|Earl of Westmorland (1624)||Mildmay Fane, 2nd Earl of Westmorland||1629||1666||
|-
|Earl of Cleveland (1626)||Thomas Wentworth, 1st Earl of Cleveland||1626||1667||
|-
|Earl of Danby (1626)||Henry Danvers, 1st Earl of Danby||1626||1644||Died, title extinct
|-
|rowspan="2"|Earl of Manchester (1626)||Henry Montagu, 1st Earl of Manchester||1626||1642||Died
|-
|Edward Montagu, 2nd Earl of Manchester||1642||1671||
|-
|Earl of Marlborough (1626)||James Ley, 3rd Earl of Marlborough||1638||1665||
|-
|rowspan="2"|Earl of Mulgrave (1626)||Edmund Sheffield, 1st Earl of Mulgrave||1626||1646||Died
|-
|Edmund Sheffield, 2nd Earl of Mulgrave||1646||1658||
|-
|Earl of Berkshire (1626)||Thomas Howard, 1st Earl of Berkshire||1626||1669||
|-
|Earl of Monmouth (1626)||Henry Carey, 2nd Earl of Monmouth||1639||1661||
|-
|rowspan="2"|Earl Rivers (1626)||Thomas Darcy, 1st Earl Rivers||1626||1640||Died
|-
|John Savage, 2nd Earl Rivers||1640||1654||
|-
|rowspan="2"|Earl of Lindsey (1626)||Robert Bertie, 1st Earl of Lindsey||1626||1642||Died
|-
|Montagu Bertie, 2nd Earl of Lindsey||1642||1666||
|-
|Earl of Newcastle-upon-Tyne (1628)||William Cavendish, 1st Earl of Newcastle-upon-Tyne||1628||1676||Created Marquess of Newcastle-upon-Tyne, see above
|-
|Earl of Dover (1628)||Henry Carey, 1st Earl of Dover||1628||1666||
|-
|rowspan="2"|Earl of Peterborough (1628)||John Mordaunt, 1st Earl of Peterborough||1628||1643||Died
|-
|Henry Mordaunt, 2nd Earl of Peterborough||1643||1697||
|-
|Earl of Stamford (1628)||Henry Grey, 1st Earl of Stamford||1628||1673||
|-
|Earl of Winchilsea (1628)||Heneage Finch, 3rd Earl of Winchilsea||1639||1689||
|-
|rowspan="2"|Earl of Kingston-upon-Hull (1628)||Robert Pierrepont, 1st Earl of Kingston-upon-Hull||1628||1643||Died
|-
|Henry Pierrepont, 2nd Earl of Kingston-upon-Hull||1643||1680||Created Marquess of Dorchester, see above
|-
|rowspan="2"|Earl of Carnarvon (1628)||Robert Dormer, 1st Earl of Carnarvon||1628||1643||Died
|-
|Charles Dormer, 2nd Earl of Carnarvon||1643||1709||
|-
|Earl of Newport (1628)||Mountjoy Blount, 1st Earl of Newport||1628||1666||
|-
|Earl of Chesterfield (1628)||Philip Stanhope, 1st Earl of Chesterfield||1628||1656||
|-
|Earl of Thanet (1628)||John Tufton, 2nd Earl of Thanet||1632||1664||
|-
|Earl of St Albans (1628)||Ulick Burke, 2nd Earl of St Albans||1635||1657||Earl, and then Marquess of Clanricarde in the Peerage of Ireland
|-
|Earl of Portland (1633)||Jerome Weston, 2nd Earl of Portland||1635||1663||
|-
|Earl of Strafford (1640)||Thomas Wentworth, 1st Earl of Strafford||1640||1641||New creation; attainted
|-
|Earl Rivers (1641)||Elizabeth Savage, Countess Rivers||1641||1651||New creation; peerage for life only
|-
|Earl of Strafford (1641)||William Wentworth, 1st Earl of Strafford||1641||1695||New creation
|-
|rowspan="2"|Earl of Sunderland (1643)||Henry Spencer, 1st Earl of Sunderland||1643||1643||New creation
|-
|Robert Spencer, 2nd Earl of Sunderland||1643||1702||
|-
|Earl of Sussex (1644)||Thomas Savile, 1st Earl of Sussex||1644||1659||New creation
|-
|Earl of Brentford (1644)||Patrick Ruthven, 1st Earl of Brentford||1644||1651||New creation
|-
|Earl of Chichester (1644)||Francis Leigh, 1st Earl of Chichester||1644||1653||New creation
|-
|Earl of Norwich (1644)||George Goring, 1st Earl of Norwich||1644||1663||New creation
|-
|Earl of Scarsdale (1645)||Francis Leke, 1st Earl of Scarsdale||1645||1655||New creation
|-
|Earl of Lichfield (1645)||Charles Stewart, 1st Earl of Lichfield||1645||1672||New creation
|-
|Viscount Hereford (1550)||Walter Devereux, 5th Viscount Hereford||1646||1658||Title previously held by Earls of Essex (extinct in 1646)
|-
|Viscount Montagu (1554)||Francis Browne, 3rd Viscount Montagu||1629||1682||
|-
|Viscount Purbeck (1618)||John Villiers, 1st Viscount Purbeck||1619||1657||
|-
|Viscount Saye and Sele (1624)||William Fiennes, 1st Viscount Saye and Sele||1624||1662||
|-
|Viscount Savage (1626)||John Savage, 2nd Earl Rivers||1635||1654||Succeeded as Earl Rivers, see above
|-
|Viscount Conway (1627)||Edward Conway, 2nd Viscount Conway||1631||1655||
|-
|rowspan="2"|Viscount Campden (1628)||Edward Noel, 2nd Viscount Campden||1629||1643||Died
|-
|Baptist Noel, 3rd Viscount Campden||1643||1682||
|-
|Viscount Wentworth (1628)||Thomas Wentworth, 1st Viscount Wentworth||1628||1641||Created Earl of Strafford, see above
|-
|Viscount Stafford (1640)||William Howard, 1st Viscount Stafford||1640||1680||New creation
|-
|Viscount Fauconberg (1643)||Thomas Belasyse, 1st Viscount Fauconberg||1643||1653||New creation
|-
|Baron de Ros (1264)||Katherine Manners, 19th Baroness de Ros||1632||1649||Died, title succeeded by the Duke of Buckingham, and on his death fell into abeyance
|-
|Baron de Clifford (1299)||Anne Clifford, 14th Baroness de Clifford||1605||1676||
|- 
|Baron Morley (1299)||Henry Parker, 14th Baron Morley||1622||1655||
|- 
|Baron Dacre (1321)||Francis Lennard, 14th Baron Dacre||1630||1662||
|- 
|rowspan="2"|Baron Grey of Ruthyn (1325)||Charles Longueville, 12th Baron Grey de Ruthyn||1639||1643||Died
|- 
|Susan Longueville, 13th Baroness Grey de Ruthyn||1643||1676||
|- 
|Baron Darcy de Knayth (1332)||Conyers Darcy, 7th Baron Darcy de Knayth||1641||1653||Abeyance terminated
|- 
|Baron Berkeley (1421)||George Berkeley, 8th Baron Berkeley||1613||1658||
|- 
|rowspan="2"|Baron Dudley (1440)||Edward Sutton, 5th Baron Dudley||1586||1643||Died
|- 
|Frances Ward, 6th Baroness Dudley||1643||1697||
|- 
|Baron Stourton (1448)||William Stourton, 11th Baron Stourton||1633||1672||
|- 
|rowspan="3"|Baron Willoughby de Broke (1491)||Greville Verney, 7th Baron Willoughby de Broke||1631||1642||Died
|- 
|Greville Verney, 8th Baron Willoughby de Broke||1642||1648||Died
|- 
|Greville Verney, 9th Baron Willoughby de Broke||1648||1668||
|- 
|Baron Monteagle (1514)||Henry Parker, 5th Baron Monteagle||1622||1655||
|-
|Baron Vaux of Harrowden (1523)||Edward Vaux, 4th Baron Vaux of Harrowden||1595||1661||
|-
|rowspan="2"|Baron Sandys of the Vine (1529)||Elizabeth Sandys, 5th Baroness Sandys||1629||1645||Died
|-
|William Sandys, 6th Baron Sandys||1645||1668||
|-
|Baron Windsor (1529)||Thomas Windsor, 6th Baron Windsor||1605||1642||Died, Barony fell into abeyance until 1660
|-
|rowspan="2"|Baron Eure (1544)||William Eure, 4th Baron Eure||1617||1646||Died
|-
|William Eure, 5th Baron Eure||1646||1652||
|-
|Baron Wharton (1545)||Philip Wharton, 4th Baron Wharton||1625||1695||
|-
|Baron Willoughby of Parham (1547)||Francis Willoughby, 5th Baron Willoughby of Parham||1618||1666||
|-
|Baron Paget (1552)||William Paget, 5th Baron Paget||1629||1678||
|-
|Baron North (1554)||Dudley North, 3rd Baron North||1600||1666||
|-
|Baron Chandos (1554)||George Brydges, 6th Baron Chandos||1621||1655||
|-
|Baron De La Warr (1570)||Charles West, 5th Baron De La Warr||1628||1687||
|-
|rowspan="2"|Baron Norreys (1572)||Elizabeth Wray, 3rd Baroness Norreys||1622||1645||Died
|-
|Bridget Bertie, 4th Baroness Norreys||1645||1657||
|-
|Baron (A)bergavenny (1604)||Henry Nevill, 2nd Baron Bergavenny||1622||1641||Died, Barony dormant
|-
|rowspan="2"|Baron Gerard (1603)||Dutton Gerard, 3rd Baron Gerard||1622||1640||Died
|-
|Charles Gerard, 4th Baron Gerard||1640||1667||
|-
|Baron Petre (1603)||William Petre, 4th Baron Petre||1638||1684||
|-
|Baron Spencer (1603)||Henry Spencer, 3rd Baron Spencer of Wormleighton||1636||1643||Created Earl of Sunderland, see above
|-
|rowspan="2"|Baron Arundell of Wardour (1605)||Thomas Arundell, 2nd Baron Arundell of Wardour||1639||1643||Died
|-
|Henry Arundell, 3rd Baron Arundell of Wardour||1643||1694||
|-
|Baron Stanhope of Harrington (1605)||Charles Stanhope, 2nd Baron Stanhope||1621||1675||
|-
|Baron Teynham (1616)||John Roper, 3rd Baron Teynham||1628||1673||
|-
|rowspan="2"|Baron Brooke (1621)||Robert Greville, 2nd Baron Brooke||1628||1643||Died
|-
|Francis Greville, 3rd Baron Brooke||1643||1658||
|-
|rowspan="2"|Baron Montagu of Boughton (1621)||Edward Montagu, 1st Baron Montagu of Boughton||1621||1644||Died
|-
|Edward Montagu, 2nd Baron Montagu of Boughton||1644||1684||
|-
|Baron Grey of Warke (1624)||William Grey, 1st Baron Grey of Werke||1624||1674||
|-
|Baron Deincourt (1624)||Francis Leke, 1st Baron Deincourt||1624||1655||Created Earl of Scarsdale, see above
|-
|Baron Robartes (1625)||John Robartes, 2nd Baron Robartes||1625||1685||
|-
|Baron Craven (1627)||Willian Craven, 1st Baron Craven||1627||1697||
|-
|Baron Fauconberg (1627)||Thomas Belasyse, 1st Baron Fauconberg||1627||1653||Created Viscount Fauconberg, see above
|-
|Baron Lovelace (1627)||John Lovelace, 2nd Baron Lovelace||1634||1670||
|-
|rowspan="2"|Baron Poulett (1627)||John Poulett, 1st Baron Poulett||1627||1649||Died
|-
|John Poulett, 2nd Baron Poulett||1649||1665||
|-
|rowspan="2"|Baron Clifford (1628)||Henry Clifford, 1st Baron Clifford||1628||1643||Succeeded as Earl of Cumberland, see above
|-
|Elizabeth Boyle, Baroness Clifford||1643||1691||
|-
|Baron Brudenell (1628)||Thomas Brudenell, 1st Baron Brudenell||1628||1663||
|-
|Baron Hervey (1628)||William Hervey, 1st Baron Hervey||1628||1642||Died, title extinct
|-
|Baron Strange (1628)||James Stanley, 1st Baron Strange||1628||1651||Succeeded as Earl of Derby, see above
|-
|rowspan="2"|Baron Maynard (1628)||William Maynard, 1st Baron Maynard||1628||1640||Died
|-
|William Maynard, 2nd Baron Maynard||1640||1699||
|-
|rowspan="2"|Baron Coventry (1628)||Thomas Coventry, 1st Baron Coventry||1628||1640||Died
|-
|Thomas Coventry, 2nd Baron Coventry||1640||1661||
|-
|Baron Goring (1628)||George Goring, 1st Baron Goring||1628||1644||Created Earl of Norwich, see above
|-
|rowspan="2"|Baron Mohun of Okehampton (1628)||John Mohun, 1st Baron Mohun of Okehampton||1628||1640||Died
|-
|Warwick Mohun, 2nd Baron Mohun of Okehampton||1640||1665||
|-
|Baron Boteler of Brantfield (1628)||William Boteler, 2nd Baron Boteler of Brantfield||1637||1657||
|-
|Baron Dunsmore (1628)||Francis Leigh, 1st Baron Dunsmore||1628||1653||Created Earl of Chichester, see above
|-
|Baron Powis (1629)||William Herbert, 1st Baron Powis||1629||1655||
|-
|rowspan="2"|Baron Herbert of Chirbury (1629)||Edward Herbert, 1st Baron Herbert of Cherbury||1629||1648||Died
|-
|Richard Herbert, 2nd Baron Herbert of Chirbury||1648||1655||
|-
|Baron Cottington (1631)||Francis Cottington, 1st Baron Cottington||1631||1652||
|-
|Baron Finch (1640)||John Finch, 1st Baron Finch||1640||1660||New creation
|-
|Baron (A)bergavenny (1641)||John Nevill, 1st Baron Bergavenny||1641||1662||New creation
|-
|Baron Lyttelton (1641)||Edward Littleton, 1st Baron Lyttelton||1641||1645||New creation; died, title extinct
|-
|Baron Seymour of Trowbridge (1641)||Francis Seymour, 1st Baron Seymour of Trowbridge||1641||1664||New creation
|-
|rowspan="2"|Baron Capell of Hadham (1641)||Arthur Capell, 1st Baron Capell of Hadham||1641||1649||New creation; died
|-
|Arthur Capell, 2nd Baron Capell of Hadham||1649||1683||
|-
|Baron Hatton (1642)||Christopher Hatton, 1st Baron Hatton||1642||1670||New creation
|-
|Baron Newport (1642)||Richard Newport, 1st Baron Newport||1642||1651||New creation
|-
|Baron Craven of Ryton (1643)||John Craven, 1st Baron Craven of Ryton||1643||1648||New creation; died, title extinct
|-
|Baron Percy of Alnwick (1643)||Henry Percy, Baron Percy of Alnwick||1643||1659||New creation
|-
|Baron Leigh (1643)||Thomas Leigh, 1st Baron Leigh||1643||1672||New creation
|-
|Baron Hopton (1643)||Ralph Hopton, 1st Baron Hopton||1643||1652||New creation
|-
|Baron Jermyn (1643)||Henry Jermyn, 1st Baron Jermyn||1643||1684||New creation
|-
|Baron Byron (1643)||John Byron, 1st Baron Byron||1643||1652||New creation
|-
|Baron Loughborough (1643)||Henry Hastings, 1st Baron Loughborough||1643||1667||New creation
|-
|Baron Widdrington (1643)||William Widdrington, 1st Baron Widdrington||1643||1651||New creation
|-
|Baron Ward (1644)||Humble Ward, 1st Baron Ward||1644||1670||New creation
|-
|Baron Colepeper (1644)||John Colepeper, 1st Baron Colepeper||1644||1660||New creation
|-
|Baron Astley of Reading (1644)||Jacob Astley, 1st Baron Astley of Reading||1644||1652||New creation
|-
|Baron Cobham (1645)||John Brooke, 1st Baron Cobham||1645||1660||New creation
|-
|Baron Lucas of Shenfield (1645)||John Lucas, 1st Baron Lucas of Shenfield||1645||1671||New creation
|-
|Baron Belasyse (1645)||John Belasyse, 1st Baron Belasyse||1645||1689||New creation
|-
|Baron Rockingham (1645)||Lewis Watson, 1st Baron Rockingham||1645||1653||New creation
|-
|Baron Reede (1645)||John de Reede, 1st Baron Reede||1645||1653||New creation; Dutch diplomat
|-
|Baron Gerard of Brandon (1645)||Charles Gerard, 1st Baron Gerard of Brandon||1645||1694||New creation
|-
|Baron Lexinton (1645)||Robert Sutton, 1st Baron Lexinton||1645||1668||New creation
|-
|}

Peerage of Scotland

|Duke of Rothesay (1398)||Charles Stuart, Duke of Rothesay||1630||1649||Acceded to the Throne of England and Scotland
|-
|Duke of Lennox (1581)||James Stewart, 4th Duke of Lennox||1624||1655||
|-
|rowspan=2|Duke of Hamilton (1643)||James Hamilton, 1st Duke of Hamilton||1643||1649||New creation; died
|-
|William Hamilton, 2nd Duke of Hamilton||1649||1651||
|-
|rowspan=2|Marquess of Huntly (1599)||George Gordon, 2nd Marquess of Huntly||1636||1649||Died
|-
|Lewis Gordon, 3rd Marquess of Huntly||1649||1653||
|-
|Marquess of Hamilton (1599)||James Hamilton, 3rd Marquess of Hamilton||1625||1649||Created Duke of Hamilton, see above
|-
|Marquess of Douglas (1633)||William Douglas, 1st Marquess of Douglas||1633||1660||
|-
|Marquess of Argyll (1641)||Archibald Campbell, 1st Marquess of Argyll||1641||1661||New creation
|-
|Marquess of Montrose (1644)||James Graham, 1st Marquess of Montrose||1644||1650||New creation
|-
|Earl of Argyll (1457)||Archibald Campbell, 8th Earl of Argyll||1638||1661||Created Marquess of Argyll, see above
|-
|Earl of Crawford (1398)||Ludovic Lindsay, 16th Earl of Crawford||1639||1652||
|-
|Earl of Erroll (1452)||Gilbert Hay, 11th Earl of Erroll||1636||1674||
|-
|Earl Marischal (1458)||William Keith, 7th Earl Marischal||1635||1671||
|-
|Earl of Sutherland (1235)||John Gordon, 14th Earl of Sutherland||1615||1679||
|-
|Earl of Mar (1114)||John Erskine, 19th Earl of Mar||1634||1654||
|-
|rowspan=2|Earl of Rothes (1458)||John Leslie, 6th Earl of Rothes||1611||1641||Died
|-
|John Leslie, 7th Earl of Rothes||1641||1681||
|-
|rowspan=3|Earl of Morton (1458)||William Douglas, 7th Earl of Morton||1606||1648||Died
|-
|Robert Douglas, 8th Earl of Morton||1648||1649||Died
|-
|William Douglas, 9th Earl of Morton||1649||1681||
|-
|Earl of Menteith (1427)||William Graham, 7th Earl of Menteith||1598||1661||
|-
|Earl of Glencairn (1488)||William Cunningham, 9th Earl of Glencairn||1631||1664||
|-
|Earl of Eglinton (1507)||Alexander Montgomerie, 6th Earl of Eglinton||1612||1661||
|-
|Earl of Montrose (1503)||James Graham, 5th Earl of Montrose||1626||1650||Created Marquess of Montrose, see above
|-
|Earl of Cassilis (1509)||John Kennedy, 6th Earl of Cassilis||1615||1668||
|-
|rowspan=2|Earl of Caithness (1455)||George Sinclair, 5th Earl of Caithness||1582||1643||Died
|-
|George Sinclair, 6th Earl of Caithness||1643||1672||
|-
|Earl of Buchan (1469)||James Erskine, 7th Earl of Buchan||1628||1664||
|-
|Earl of Moray (1562)||James Stewart, 4th Earl of Moray||1638||1653||
|-
|Earl of Linlithgow (1600)||Alexander Livingston, 2nd Earl of Linlithgow||1621||1650||
|-
|Earl of Winton (1600)||George Seton, 3rd Earl of Winton||1607||1650||
|-
|Earl of Home (1605)||James Home, 3rd Earl of Home||1633||1666||
|-
|Earl of Perth (1605)||John Drummond, 2nd Earl of Perth||1611||1662||
|-
|Earl of Dunfermline (1605)||Charles Seton, 2nd Earl of Dunfermline||1622||1672||
|-
|Earl of Wigtown (1606)||John Fleming, 2nd Earl of Wigtown||1619||1650||
|-
|Earl of Abercorn (1606)||James Hamilton, 2nd Earl of Abercorn||1618||1670||
|-
|rowspan=2|Earl of Kinghorne (1606)||John Lyon, 2nd Earl of Kinghorne||1615||1646||Died
|-
|Patrick Lyon, 3rd Earl of Kinghorne||1646||1695||
|-
|Earl of Roxburghe (1616)||Robert Ker, 1st Earl of Roxburghe||1616||1650||
|-
|rowspan=2|Earl of Kellie (1619)||Thomas Erskine, 2nd Earl of Kellie||1639||1643||Died
|-
|Alexander Erskine, 3rd Earl of Kellie||1643||1677||
|-
|Earl of Buccleuch (1619)||Francis Scott, 2nd Earl of Buccleuch||1633||1651||
|-
|rowspan=3|Earl of Haddington (1619)||Thomas Hamilton, 2nd Earl of Haddington||1637||1640||Died
|-
|Thomas Hamilton, 3rd Earl of Haddington||1640||1645||Died
|-
|John Hamilton, 4th Earl of Haddington||1645||1669||
|-
|rowspan=2|Earl of Nithsdale (1620)||Robert Maxwell, 1st Earl of Nithsdale||1620||1646||Died
|-
|Robert Maxwell, 2nd Earl of Nithsdale||1646||1667||
|-
|rowspan=2|Earl of Galloway (1623)||Alexander Stewart, 1st Earl of Galloway||1623||1649||Died
|-
|James Stewart, 2nd Earl of Galloway||1649||1671||
|-
|Earl of Seaforth (1623)||George Mackenzie, 2nd Earl of Seaforth||1633||1651||
|-
|rowspan=2|Earl of Lauderdale (1624)||John Maitland, 1st Earl of Lauderdale||1624||1645||Died
|-
|John Maitland, 2nd Earl of Lauderdale||1645||1682||
|-
|rowspan=2|Earl of Annandale (1625)||John Murray, 1st Earl of Annandale||1625||1640||Died
|-
|James Murray, 2nd Earl of Annandale||1640||1658||
|-
|rowspan=2|Earl of Tullibardine (1628)||Patrick Murray, 1st Earl of Tullibardine||1628||1644||Died
|-
|James Murray, 2nd Earl of Tullibardine||1644||1670||
|-
|Earl of Carrick (1628)||John Stewart, 1st Earl of Carrick||1628||1646||Died, title extinct
|-
|rowspan=2|Earl of Atholl (1629)||John Murray, 1st Earl of Atholl||1629||1642||Died
|-
|John Murray, 2nd Earl of Atholl||1642||1703||
|-
|Earl of Lothian (1631)||William Kerr, 1st Earl of Lothian||1631||1675||
|-
|Earl of Airth (1633)||William Graham, 1st Earl of Airth||1633||1661||
|-
|Earl of Lindsay (1633)||John Lindsay, 1st Earl of Lindsay||1633||1678||Succeeded to the more senior Earldom of Crawford, see above
|-
|Earl of Loudoun (1633)||John Campbell, 1st Earl of Loudoun||1633||1662||
|-
|rowspan=2|Earl of Kinnoull (1633)||George Hay, 2nd Earl of Kinnoull||1634||1644||Died
|-
|George Hay, 3rd Earl of Kinnoull||1644||1650||
|-
|rowspan=2|Earl of Dumfries (1633)||William Crichton, 1st Earl of Dumfries||1633||1643||Died
|-
|William Crichton, 2nd Earl of Dumfries||1643||1691||
|-
|rowspan=2|Earl of Queensberry (1633)||William Douglas, 1st Earl of Queensberry||1633||1640||Died
|-
|James Douglas, 2nd Earl of Queensberry||1640||1671||
|-
|rowspan=4|Earl of Stirling (1633)||William Alexander, 1st Earl of Stirling||1633||1640||Died
|-
|William Alexander, 2nd Earl of Stirling||1640||1640||Died
|-
|Henry Alexander, 3rd Earl of Stirling||1640||1644||Died
|-
|Henry Alexander, 4th Earl of Stirling||1644||1691||
|-
|Earl of Elgin (1633)||Thomas Bruce, 1st Earl of Elgin||1633||1663||
|-
|Earl of Southesk (1633)||David Carnegie, 1st Earl of Southesk||1633||1658||
|-
|Earl of Traquair (1633)||John Stewart, 1st Earl of Traquair||1633||1659||
|-
|Earl of Ancram (1633)||Robert Kerr, 1st Earl of Ancram||1633||1654||
|-
|rowspan=2|Earl of Wemyss (1633)||John Wemyss, 1st Earl of Wemyss||1633||1649||Died
|-
|David Wemyss, 2nd Earl of Wemyss||1649||1679||
|-
|Earl of Dalhousie (1633)||William Ramsay, 1st Earl of Dalhousie||1633||1672||
|-
|Earl of Findlater (1638)||James Ogilvy, 1st Earl of Findlater||1638||1653||
|-
|Earl of Lanark (1639)||William Hamilton, 1st Earl of Lanark||1639||1651||Succeeded to the Dukedom of Hamilton, see above
|-
|Earl of Airlie (1639)||James Ogilvy, 1st Earl of Airlie||1639||1665||
|-
|Earl of Carnwath (1639)||Robert Dalzell, 1st Earl of Carnwath||1639||1654||
|-
|Earl of Callendar (1641)||James Livingston, 1st Earl of Callendar||1641||1674||New creation
|-
|Earl of Leven (1641)||Alexander Leslie, 1st Earl of Leven||1641||1661||New creation
|-
|Earl of Forth (1642)||Patrick Ruthven, 1st Earl of Forth||1642||1651||New creation
|-
|Earl of Irvine (1642)||James Campbell, 1st Earl of Irvine||1642||1654||New creation; died, Earldom extinct; the Lordship Kintyre passed to the Marquess of Argyll
|-
|Earl of Hartfell (1643)||William Murray, 1st Earl of Dysart||1643||1655||New creation
|-
|Earl of Dysart (1643)||Robert Dalzell, 1st Earl of Carnwath||1643||1654||New creation
|-
|Earl of Dirletoun (1646)||James Maxwell, 1st Earl of Dirletoun||1646||1650||New creation
|-
|Earl of Panmure (1646)||Patrick Maule, 1st Earl of Panmure||1646||1661||New creation
|-
|Earl of Selkirk (1646)||William Hamilton, 1st Earl of Selkirk||1646||1694||New creation
|-
|Earl of Tweeddale (1646)||John Hay, 1st Earl of Tweeddale||1646||1653||New creation
|-
|Earl of Northesk (1647)||John Carnegie, 1st Earl of Northesk||1647||1667||New creation
|-
|Earl of Kincardine (1647)||Edward Bruce, 1st Earl of Kincardine||1647||1662||New creation
|-
|rowspan=3|Viscount of Falkland (1620)||Lucius Cary, 2nd Viscount of Falkland||1633||1643||Died
|-
|Lucius Cary, 3rd Viscount of Falkland||1643||1649||Died
|-
|Henry Cary, 4th Viscount of Falkland||1649||1663||
|-
|rowspan=2|Viscount of Dunbar (1620)||Henry Constable, 1st Viscount of Dunbar||1620||1645||Died
|-
|John Constable, 2nd Viscount of Dunbar||1645||1668||
|-
|Viscount of Stormont (1621)||Mungo Murray, 2nd Viscount of Stormont||1631||1642||Died, title succeeded by the Earl of Annandale
|-
|Viscount of Aboyne (1632)||James Gordon, 2nd Viscount Aboyne||1636||1649||Died, title extinct
|-
|rowspan=2|Viscount of Kenmure (1633)||John Gordon, 3rd Viscount of Kenmure||1639||1643||Died
|-
|Robert Gordon, 4th Viscount of Kenmure||1643||1663||
|-
|Viscount of Arbuthnott (1641)||Robert Arbuthnot, 1st Viscount of Arbuthnott||1641||1655||New creation
|-
|rowspan=3|Viscount of Dudhope (1641)||John Scrymgeour, 1st Viscount of Dudhope||1641||1643||New creation; died
|-
|James Scrymgeour, 2nd Viscount of Dudhope||1643||1644||Died
|-
|John Scrymgeour, 3rd Viscount of Dudhope||1644||1668||
|-
|Viscount of Frendraught (1642)||James Crichton, 1st Viscount of Frendraught||1642||1650||New creation
|-
|Viscount of Newburgh (1647)||James Levingston, 1st Viscount of Newburgh||1647||1670||New creation
|-
|rowspan=2|Lord Somerville (1430)||Hugh Somerville, 9th Lord Somerville||1618||1640||Died
|-
|James Somerville, 10th Lord Somerville||1640||1677||
|-
|rowspan=2|Lord Forbes (1442)||Arthur Forbes, 9th Lord Forbes||1606||1641||Died
|-
|Alexander Forbes, 10th Lord Forbes||1641||1672||
|-
|Lord Saltoun (1445)||Alexander Abernethy, 9th Lord Saltoun||1612||1668||
|-
|Lord Gray (1445)||Andrew Gray, 7th Lord Gray||1611||1663||
|-
|Lord Sinclair (1449)||John Sinclair, 9th Lord Sinclair||1615||1676||
|-
|Lord Borthwick (1452)||John Borthwick, 9th Lord Borthwick||1623||1675||
|-
|rowspan=2|Lord Boyd (1454)||Robert Boyd, 8th Lord Boyd||1628||1640||Died
|-
|James Boyd, 9th Lord Boyd||1640||1654||
|-
|Lord Oliphant (1455)||Patrick Oliphant, 6th Lord Oliphant||1631||1680||
|-
|Lord Cathcart (1460)||Alan Cathcart, 6th Lord Cathcart||1628||1709||
|-
|rowspan=2|Lord Lovat (1464)||Hugh Fraser, 7th Lord Lovat||1633||1646||Died
|-
|Hugh Fraser, 8th Lord Lovat||1646||1672||
|-
|Lord Hay of Yester (1488)||John Hay, 8th Lord Hay of Yester||1609||1653||Created Earl of Tweeddale, see above
|-
|rowspan=2|Lord Sempill (1489)||Francis Sempill, 6th Lord Sempill||1639||1644||Died
|-
|Robert Sempill, 7th Lord Sempill||1644||1675||
|-
|Lord Herries of Terregles (1490)||John Maxwell, 7th Lord Herries of Terregles||1631||1677||
|-
|rowspan=3|Lord Ross (1499)||William Ross, 8th Lord Ross||1636||1640||Died
|-
|Robert Ross, 9th Lord Ross||1640||1648||Died
|-
|William Ross, 10th Lord Ross||1648||1656||
|-
|rowspan=2|Lord Elphinstone (1509)||Alexander Elphinstone, 5th Lord Elphinstone||1638||1648||Died
|-
|Alexander Elphinstone, 6th Lord Elphinstone||1648||1654||
|-
|Lord Ochiltree (1543)||James Stewart, 4th Lord Ochiltree||1615||1658||
|-
|rowspan=2|Lord Torphichen (1564)||John Sandilands, 5th Lord Torphichen||1637||1649||Died
|-
|Walter Sandilands, 6th Lord Torphichen||1649||1696||
|-
|rowspan=2|Lord Spynie (1590)||Alexander Lindsay, 2nd Lord Spynie||1607||1646||Died
|-
|George Lindsay, 3rd Lord Spynie||1646||1671||
|-
|rowspan=2|Lord Lindores (1600)||Patrick Leslie, 2nd Lord Lindores||1608||1649||Died
|-
|James Leslie, 3rd Lord Lindores||1649||1666||
|-
|Lord Colville of Culross (1604)||James Colville, 2nd Lord Colville of Culross||1629||1654||
|-
|rowspan=2|Lord Balmerinoch (1606)||John Elphinstone, 2nd Lord Balmerino||1612||1649||Died
|-
|John Elphinstone, 3rd Lord Balmerino||1649||1704||
|-
|rowspan=2|Lord Blantyre (1606)||Walter Stewart, 3rd Lord Blantyre||1638||1641||Died
|-
|Alexander Stewart, 4th Lord Blantyre||1641||1670||
|-
|Lord Coupar (1607)||James Elphinstone, 1st Lord Coupar||1607||1669||
|-
|Lord Balfour of Burleigh (1607)||Robert Balfour, 2nd Lord Balfour of Burleigh||1619||1663||
|-
|rowspan=2|Lord Cranstoun (1609)||John Cranstoun, 2nd Lord Cranstoun||1627||1648||Died
|-
|William Cranstoun, 3rd Lord Cranstoun||1648||1664||
|-
|rowspan=2|Lord Maderty (1609)||John Drummond, 2nd Lord Madderty||1623||1647||Died
|-
|David Drummond, 3rd Lord Madderty||1647||1692||
|-
|Lord Dingwall (1609)||Elizabeth Preston, 2nd Lady Dingwall||1628||1684||
|-
|Lord Cardross (1610)||David Erskine, 2nd Lord Cardross||1634||1671||
|-
|rowspan=2|Lord Melville of Monymaill (1616)||John Melville, 3rd Lord Melville||1635||1643||Died
|-
|George Melville, 4th Lord Melville||1643||1707||
|-
|Lord Kintyre (1626)||James Campbell, 1st Lord Kintyre||1626||1645||Created Earl of Irvine in 1642, see above. 
|-
|rowspan=2|Lord Aston of Forfar (1627)||Walter Aston, 1st Lord Aston of Forfar||1627||1639||Died
|-
|Walter Aston, 2nd Lord Aston of Forfar||1639||1678||
|-
|Lord Barrett (1627)||Edward Barrett, 1st Lord Barrett of Newburgh||1627||1645||Died, title extinct
|-
|rowspan=3|Lord Fairfax of Cameron (1627)||Thomas Fairfax, 1st Lord Fairfax of Cameron||1627||1640||Died
|-
|Ferdinando Fairfax, 2nd Lord Fairfax of Cameron||1640||1648||Died
|-
|Thomas Fairfax, 3rd Lord Fairfax of Cameron||1648||1671||
|-
|rowspan=2|Lord Napier (1627)||Archibald Napier, 1st Lord Napier||1627||1645||Died
|-
|Archibald Napier, 2nd Lord Napier||1645||1660||
|-
|rowspan=2|Lord Reay (1628)||Donald Mackay, 1st Lord Reay||1628||1649||Died
|-
|John Mackay, 2nd Lord Reay||1649||1681||
|-
|Lord Cramond (1628)||Elizabeth Richardson, 1st Lady Cramond||1628||1651||
|-
|rowspan=2|Lord Lindsay of Balcarres (1633)||David Lindsay, 1st Lord Balcarres||1633||1641||Died
|-
|Alexander Lindsay, 2nd Lord Balcarres||1641||1659||
|-
|Lord Livingston of Almond (1633)||James Livingston, 1st Lord Livingston of Almond||1633||1674||Created Earl of Callendar, see above
|-
|Lord Forbes of Pitsligo (1633)||Alexander Forbes, 2nd Lord Forbes of Pitsligo||1636||1690||
|-
|rowspan=3|Lord Kirkcudbright (1633)||Robert Maclellan, 1st Lord Kirkcudbright||1633||1641||Died
|-
|Thomas Maclellan, 2nd Lord Kirkcudbright||1641||1647||Died
|-
|John Maclellan, 3rd Lord Kirkcudbright||1647||1664||
|-
|Lord Fraser (1633)||Andrew Fraser, 2nd Lord Fraser||1636||1674||
|-
|Lord Forrester (1633)||George Forrester, 1st Lord Forrester||1633||1654||
|-
|Lord Innerwick (1638)||James Maxwell, 1st Lord Innerwick||1638||1650||Created Earl of Dirletoun, see above
|-
|Lord Rosehill and Inglismaldie (1639)||John Carnegie, 1st Lord Rosehill and Inglismaldie||1639||1667||Created Earl of Northesk, see above
|-
|Lord Ruthven of Ettrick (1639)||Patrick Ruthven, 1st Lord Ruthven of Ettrick||1639||1651||Created Earl of Forth, see above
|-
|Lord Bargany (1641)||John Hamilton, 1st Lord Bargany||1641||1658||New creation
|-
|rowspan=2|Lord Balvaird (1641)||Andrew Murray, 1st Lord Balvaird||1641||1644||New creation; died
|-
|David Murray, 2nd Lord Balvaird||1644||1664||
|-
|Lord Eythin (1642)||James King, 1st Lord Eythin||1642||1652||New creation
|-
|Lord Banff (1642)||George Ogilvy, 1st Lord Banff||1642||1663||New creation
|-
|rowspan=2|Lord Elibank (1643)||Patrick Murray, 1st Lord Elibank||1643||1649||New creation; died
|-
|Patrick Murray, 2nd Lord Elibank||1649||1661||
|-
|Lord Dunkeld (1645)||James Galloway, 1st Lord Dunkeld||1645||1660||New creation
|-
|Lord Falconer of Halkerton (1646)||Alexander Falconer, 1st Lord Falconer of Halkerton||1646||1671||New creation
|-
|Lord Abercrombie (1647)||James Sandilands, 1st Lord Abercrombie||1647||1658||New creation
|-
|Lord Belhaven and Stenton (1647)||John Hamilton, 1st Lord Belhaven and Stenton||1647||1679||New creation
|-
|Lord Cochrane of Dundonald (1647)||William Cochrane, Lord Cochrane of Dundonald||1647||1685||New creation
|-
|Lord Carmichael (1647)||James Carmichael, 1st Lord Carmichael||1647||1672||New creation
|-
|}

Peerage of Ireland

|Marquess of Ormonde (1642)||James Butler, 1st Duke of Ormonde||1642||1688||New creation
|-
|Marquess of Antrim (1645)||Randal MacDonnell, 1st Marquess of Antrim||1645||1683||New creation
|-
|Marquess of Clanricarde (1646)||Ulick Burke, 1st Marquess of Clanricarde||1646||1657||New creation
|-
|Earl of Kildare (1316)||George FitzGerald, 16th Earl of Kildare||1620||1660||
|-
|Earl of Ormond (1328)||James Butler, 12th Earl of Ormonde||1633||1688||Created Marquess of Ormonde, see above
|-
|Earl of Waterford (1446)||John Talbot, 10th Earl of Waterford||1630||1654||
|-
|Earl of Clanricarde (1543)||Ulick Burke, 5th Earl of Clanricarde||1635||1657||Created Marquess of Clanricarde, see above
|-
|Earl of Thomond (1543)||Barnabas O'Brien, 6th Earl of Thomond||1639||1657||
|-
|Earl of Castlehaven (1616)||James Tuchet, 3rd Earl of Castlehaven||1630||1684||
|-
|rowspan=2|Earl of Cork (1620)||Richard Boyle, 1st Earl of Cork||1620||1643||Died
|-
|Richard Boyle, 2nd Earl of Cork||1643||1698||
|-
|Earl of Antrim (1620)||Randal MacDonnell, 2nd Earl of Antrim||1636||1682||Created Marquess of Antrim, see above
|-
|rowspan=2|Earl of Westmeath (1621)||Richard Nugent, 1st Earl of Westmeath||1621||1642||Died
|-
|Richard Nugent, 2nd Earl of Westmeath||1642||1684||
|-
|rowspan=4|Earl of Roscommon (1622)||James Dillon, 1st Earl of Roscommon||1622||1642||Died
|-
|Robert Dillon, 2nd Earl of Roscommon||1642||1642||Died
|-
|James Dillon, 3rd Earl of Roscommon||1642||1649||Died
|-
|Wentworth Dillon, 4th Earl of Roscommon||1649||1685||
|-
|rowspan=2|Earl of Londonderry (1622)||Robert Ridgeway, 2nd Earl of Londonderry||1631||1641||Died
|-
|Weston Ridgeway, 3rd Earl of Londonderry||1641||1672||
|-
|Earl of Meath (1627)||William Brabazon, 1st Earl of Meath||1627||1651||
|-
|rowspan=2|Earl of Barrymore (1628)||David Barry, 1st Earl of Barrymore||1628||1642||Died
|-
|Richard Barry, 2nd Earl of Barrymore||1642||1694||
|-
|Earl of Carbery (1628)||Richard Vaughan, 2nd Earl of Carbery||1634||1687||
|-
|rowspan=2|Earl of Fingall (1628)||Christopher Plunkett, 2nd Earl of Fingall||1637||1649||Died
|-
|Luke Plunkett, 3rd Earl of Fingall||1649||1684||
|-
|rowspan=2|Earl of Downe (1628)||William Pope, 1st Earl of Downe||1628||1640||Died
|-
|Thomas Pope, 2nd Earl of Downe||1640||1660||
|-
|Earl of Desmond (1628)||George Feilding, 1st Earl of Desmond||1628||1665||
|-
|Earl of Ardglass (1645)||Thomas Cromwell, 1st Earl of Ardglass||1645||1653||New creation
|-
|Earl of Leinster (1646)||Robert Cholmondeley, 1st Earl of Leinster||1646||1659||New creation
|-
|Earl of Donegall (1647)||Arthur Chichester, 1st Earl of Donegall||1647||1675||New creation
|-
|Earl of Cavan (1647)||Charles Lambart, 1st Earl of Cavan||1647||1660||New creation
|-
|Earl of Clanbrassil (1647)||James Hamilton, 1st Earl of Clanbrassil||1647||1659||New creation
|-
|rowspan=2|Viscount Gormanston (1478)||Nicholas Preston, 6th Viscount Gormanston||1630||1643||Died
|-
|Jenico Preston, 7th Viscount Gormanston||1643||1691||
|-
|Viscount Mountgarret (1550)||Richard Butler, 3rd Viscount Mountgarret||1602||1651||
|-
|rowspan=2|Viscount Grandison (1621)||William Villiers, 2nd Viscount Grandison||1630||1643||Died
|-
|John Villiers, 3rd Viscount Grandison||1643||1661||
|-
|rowspan=2|Viscount Wilmot (1621)||Charles Wilmot, 1st Viscount Wilmot||1621||1644||Died
|-
|Henry Wilmot, 2nd Viscount Wilmot||1644||1658||
|-
|rowspan=2|Viscount Valentia (1621/1622)||Henry Power, 1st Viscount Valentia||1621||1642||Died; succession according to 1622 regrant 
|-
|Francis Annesley, 1st Viscount Valentia||1642||1660||
|-
|rowspan=2|Viscount Moore (1621)||Charles Moore, 2nd Viscount Moore||1627||1643||Died
|-
|Henry Moore, 3rd Viscount Moore||1643||1675||
|-
|Viscount Dillon (1622)||Thomas Dillon, 4th Viscount Dillon||1630||1672||
|-
|rowspan=2|Viscount Loftus (1622)||Adam Loftus, 1st Viscount Loftus||1622||1643||Died
|-
|Edward Loftus, 2nd Viscount Loftus||1643||1680||
|-
|Viscount Beaumont of Swords (1622)||Sapcote Beaumont, 2nd Viscount Beaumont of Swords||1625||1658||
|-
|Viscount Netterville (1622)||Nicholas Netterville, 1st Viscount Netterville||1622||1654||
|-
|rowspan=2|Viscount Montgomery (1622)||Hugh Montgomery, 2nd Viscount Montgomery||1636||1642||Died
|-
|Hugh Montgomery, 3rd Viscount Montgomery||1642||1663||
|-
|rowspan=2|Viscount Claneboye (1622)||James Hamilton, 1st Viscount Claneboye||1622||1644||Died
|-
|James Hamilton, 2nd Viscount Claneboye||1644||1659||Created Earl of Clanbrassil, see above
|-
|Viscount Magennis (1623)||Arthur Magennis, 3rd Viscount Magennis||1639||1683||
|-
|Viscount Lecale (1624)||Thomas Cromwell, 1st Viscount Lecale||1624||1653||Created Earl of Ardglass, see above
|-
|Viscount Chichester (1625)||Edward Chichester, 1st Viscount Chichester||1625||1648||Created Earl of Donegall, see above
|-
|Viscount Kilmorey (1625)||Robert Needham, 2nd Viscount Kilmorey||1631||1653||
|-
|Viscount Somerset (1626)||Thomas Somerset, 1st Viscount Somerset||1626||1649||Died, title extinct
|-
|Viscount Baltinglass (1627)||Thomas Roper, 2nd Viscount Baltinglass||1637||1670||
|-
|rowspan=3|Viscount Castleton (1627)||Nicholas Saunderson, 2nd Viscount Castleton||1630||1640||Died
|-
|Nicholas Saunderson, 3rd Viscount Castleton||1640||1641||Died
|-
|Peregrine Saunderson, 4th Viscount Castleton||1641||1650||
|-
|Viscount Killultagh (1627)||Edward Conway, 2nd Viscount Killultagh||1631||1655||
|-
|rowspan=2|Viscount Mayo (1627)||Miles Bourke, 2nd Viscount Mayo||1629||1649||Died
|-
|Theobald Bourke, 3rd Viscount Mayo||1649||1652||
|-
|rowspan=2|Viscount Sarsfield (1627)||William Sarsfield, 2nd Viscount Sarsfield||1636||1648||Died
|-
|David Sarsfield, 3rd Viscount Sarsfield||1648||1687||
|-
|rowspan=2|Viscount Boyle of Kinalmeaky (1628)||Lewis Boyle, 1st Viscount Boyle of Kinalmeaky||1628||1642||Died
|-
|Richard Boyle, 2nd Viscount Boyle of Kinalmeaky||1642||1698||Succeeded as Earl of Cork, see above
|-
|rowspan=2|Viscount Chaworth (1628)||John Chaworth, 2nd Viscount Chaworth||1639||1644||Died
|-
|Patrick Chaworth, 3rd Viscount Chaworth||1644||1693||
|-
|Viscount Savile (1628)||Thomas Savile, 1st Viscount Savile||1628||1659||
|-
|Viscount Cholmondeley (1628)||Robert Cholmondeley, 1st Viscount Cholmondeley||1628||1659||Created Earl of Leinster, see above
|-
|Viscount Lumley (1628)||Richard Lumley, 1st Viscount Lumley||1628||1663||
|-
|rowspan=2|Viscount Taaffe (1628)||John Taaffe, 1st Viscount Taaffe||1628||1642||Died
|-
|Theobald Taaffe, 2nd Viscount Taaffe||1642||1677||
|-
|Viscount Molyneux (1628)||Richard Molyneux, 2nd Viscount Molyneux||1636||1654||
|-
|Viscount Monson (1628)||William Monson, 1st Viscount Monson||1628||1660||
|-
|rowspan=2|Viscount Muskerry (1628)||Charles MacCarthy, 1st Viscount Muskerry||1628||1641||Died
|-
|Donough MacCarty, 2nd Viscount Muskerry||1640||1665||
|-
|Viscount Strangford (1628)||Philip Smythe, 2nd Viscount Strangford||1635||1708||
|-
|Viscount Scudamore (1628)||John Scudamore, 1st Viscount Scudamore||1628||1671||
|-
|rowspan=2|Viscount Wenman (1628)||Richard Wenman, 1st Viscount Wenman||1628||1640||Died
|-
|Thomas Wenman, 2nd Viscount Wenman||1640||1665||
|-
|rowspan=2|Viscount Ranelagh (1628)||Roger Jones, 1st Viscount Ranelagh||1628||1643||Died
|-
|Arthur Jones, 2nd Viscount Ranelagh||1643||1669||
|-
|Viscount Bourke of Clanmories (1629)||Thomas Bourke, 2nd Viscount Bourke||1635||1650||
|-
|Viscount FitzWilliam (1629)||Thomas FitzWilliam, 1st Viscount FitzWilliam||1629||1650||
|-
|rowspan=3|Viscount Fairfax of Emley (1629)||Thomas Fairfax, 2nd Viscount Fairfax of Emley||1636||1641||Died
|-
|William Fairfax, 3rd Viscount Fairfax of Emley||1641||1648||Died
|-
|Thomas Fairfax, 4th Viscount Fairfax of Emley||1648||1651||
|-
|Viscount Ikerrin (1629)||Pierce Butler, 1st Viscount Ikerrin||1629||1674||
|-
|Viscount Clanmalier (1631)||Lewis O'Dempsey, 2nd Viscount Clanmalier||1638||1683||
|-
|Viscount Cullen (1642)||Charles Cokayne, 1st Viscount Cullen||1642||1661||New creation
|-
|Viscount Carrington (1643)||Charles Smyth, 1st Viscount Carrington||1643||1665||New creation
|-
|rowspan=2|Viscount Tracy (1643)||John Tracy, 1st Viscount Tracy||1643||1648||New creation; died
|-
|Robert Tracy, 2nd Viscount Tracy||1648||1662||
|-
|Viscount Bulkeley (1644)||Thomas Bulkeley, 1st Viscount Bulkeley||1644||1659||New creation
|-
|Viscount Bellomont (1645)||Henry Bard, 1st Viscount Bellomont||1645||1656||New creation
|-
|rowspan=2|Viscount Brouncker (1645)||William Brouncker, 1st Viscount Brouncker||1645||1645||New creation; died
|-
|William Brouncker, 2nd Viscount Brouncker||1645||1684||New creation
|-
|Viscount Ogle (1645)||William Ogle, 1st Viscount Ogle||1645||1682||New creation
|-
|Viscount Barnewall (1646)||Nicholas Barnewall, 1st Viscount Barnewall||1646||1663||New creation
|-
|Viscount Galmoye (1646)||Edward Butler, 1st Viscount of Galmoye||1646||1653||New creation
|-
|rowspan=2|Baron Athenry (1172)||Richard III de Bermingham||1612||1645||Died
|-
|Francis de Bermingham, 12th Baron Athenry||1645||1677||
|-
|rowspan=2|Baron Kingsale (1223)||Gerald de Courcy, 19th Baron Kingsale||1628||1642||Died
|-
|Patrick de Courcy, 20th Baron Kingsale||1642||1663||
|-
|Baron Kerry (1223)||Patrick Fitzmaurice, 19th Baron Kerry||1630||1661||
|-
|rowspan=2|Baron Slane (1370)||William Fleming, 14th Baron Slane||1629||1641||Died
|-
|Charles Fleming, 15th Baron Slane||1641||1661||
|-
|rowspan=2|Baron Howth (1425)||Nicholas St Lawrence, 11th Baron Howth||1619||1643||Died
|-
|William St Lawrence, 12th Baron Howth||1643||1671||
|-
|Baron Trimlestown (1461)||Matthias Barnewall, 8th Baron Trimlestown||1539||1667||
|-
|Baron Dunsany (1462)||Patrick Plunkett, 9th Baron of Dunsany||1603||1668||
|-
|Baron Power (1535)||John Power, 5th Baron Power||1607||1661||
|-
|rowspan=2|Baron Dunboyne (1541)||Edmond Butler, 3rd/13th Baron Dunboyne||1624||1640||Died
|-
|James Butler, 4th/14th Baron Dunboyne||1640||1662||
|-
|Baron Louth (1541)||Oliver Plunkett, 6th Baron Louth||1629||1679||
|-
|Baron Upper Ossory (1541)||Barnaby Fitzpatrick, 6th Baron Upper Ossory||1638||1666||
|-
|Baron Inchiquin (1543)||Murrough O'Brien, 6th Baron Inchiquin||1624||1674||
|-
|Baron Bourke of Castleconnell (1580)||William Bourke, 6th Baron Bourke of Connell||1635||1665||
|-
|rowspan=2|Baron Cahir (1583)||Thomas Butler, 3rd Baron Cahir||1627||1648||Died
|-
|Pierce Butler, 4th Baron Cahir||1648||1676||
|-
|Baron Hamilton (1617)||James Hamilton, 3rd Baron Hamilton of Strabane||1638||1655||
|-
|Baron Bourke of Brittas (1618)||Theobald Bourke, 1st Baron Bourke of Brittas||1618||1654||
|-
|Baron Lambart (1618)||Charles Lambart, 2nd Baron Lambart||1618||1660||Created Earl of Cavan, see above
|-
|Baron Mountjoy (1618)||Mountjoy Blount, 1st Baron Mountjoy||1618||1665||
|-
|Baron Castle Stewart (1619)||Andrew Stewart, 3rd Baron Castle Stewart||1639||1650||
|-
|Baron Folliot (1620)||Thomas Folliott, 2nd Baron Folliott||1622||1697||
|-
|rowspan=2|Baron Maynard (1620)||William Maynard, 1st Baron Maynard||1620||1640||Died
|-
|William Maynard, 2nd Baron Maynard||1640||1699||
|-
|Baron Gorges of Dundalk (1620)||Edward Gorges, 1st Baron Gorges of Dundalk||1620||1650||
|-
|Baron Offaly (1620)||Lettice Digby, 1st Baroness Offaly||1620||1658||
|-
|rowspan=2|Baron Digby (1620)||Robert Digby, 1st Baron Digby||1620||1642||Died
|-
|Kildare Digby, 2nd Baron Digby||1642||1661||
|-
|Baron Hervey (1620)||William Hervey, 1st Baron Hervey||1620||1642||Died, title extinct
|-
|rowspan=2|Baron Fitzwilliam (1620)||William Fitzwilliam, 1st Baron Fitzwilliam||1620||1644||Died
|-
|William Fitzwilliam, 2nd Baron Fitzwilliam||1644||1658||
|-
|rowspan=4|Baron Caulfeild (1620)||William Caulfeild, 2nd Baron Caulfeild||1627||1640||Died
|-
|Toby Caulfeild, 3rd Baron Caulfeild||1640||1642||Died
|-
|Robert Caulfeild, 4th Baron Caulfeild||1642||1642||Died
|-
|William Caulfeild, 5th Baron Caulfield||1642||1671||
|-
|Baron Aungier (1621)||Gerald Aungier, 2nd Baron Aungier of Longford||1632||1655||
|-
|rowspan=2|Baron Blayney (1621)||Henry Blayney, 2nd Baron Blayney||1629||1646||Died
|-
|Edward Blayney, 3rd Baron Blayney||1646||1669||
|-
|Baron Dockwra (1621)||Theodore Dockwra, 2nd Baron Dockwra||1631||1647||Died, title extinct
|-
|Baron Esmonde (1622)||Laurence Esmonde, 1st Baron Esmonde||1622||1646||Died, title extinct
|-
|Baron Brereton (1624)||William Brereton, 2nd Baron Brereton||1631||1664||
|-
|rowspan=2|Baron Herbert of Castle Island (1624)||Edward Herbert, 1st Baron Herbert of Castle Island||1624||1648||Died
|-
|Richard Herbert, 2nd Baron Herbert of Castle Island||1648||1655||
|-
|Baron Baltimore (1625)||Cecilius Calvert, 2nd Baron Baltimore||1632||1675||
|-
|Baron Coleraine (1625)||Hugh Hare, 1st Baron Coleraine||1625||1667||
|-
|rowspan=2|Baron Sherard (1627)||William Sherard, 1st Baron Sherard||1627||1640||Died
|-
|Bennet Sherard, 2nd Baron Sherard||1640||1700||
|-
|Baron Boyle of Broghill (1628)||Roger Boyle, 1st Baron Boyle of Broghill||1628||1679||
|-
|Baron Maguire (1628)||Connor Maguire, 2nd Baron Maguire||1633||1645||Attainted and the barony was forfeited
|-
|Baron Mountnorris (1629)||Francis Annesley, 1st Baron Mountnorris||1629||1660||Succeeded to the Viscountcy Valentia, see above
|-
|rowspan=2|Baron Alington (1642)||William Alington, 1st Baron Alington||1642||1648||New creation; died
|-
|Giles Alington, 2nd Baron Alington||1648||1659||
|-
|Baron Hawley (1646)||Francis Hawley, 1st Baron Hawley||1646||1684||New creation
|-
|}

References

 

Lists of peers by decade
1640s in England
1640s in Ireland
17th century in England
17th century in Scotland
17th century in Ireland
Lists of 17th-century English people
17th-century Scottish peers
17th-century Irish people
Peers
Peers